Eupithecia irriguata, the marbled pug, is a moth of the family Geometridae. The species can be found in Europe and North Africa.

The wingspan is 18–20 mm and the moths fly from April to June, depending on the location. The larvae feed on the leaves of oak (Quercus species).

Subspecies
Eupithecia irriguata irriguata
Eupithecia irriguata eriguata Staudinger, 1871
Eupithecia irriguata kurdica Prout 1938
Eupithecia irriguata staudingeri Bohatsch, 1893

References

External links
Marbled pug on UKmoths
Lepiforum.de

irriguata
Moths described in 1813
Moths of Africa
Moths of Europe
Taxa named by Jacob Hübner